In This Moment We Are Free – Cities is the debut studio album by progressive metal band VUUR. It was released on 20 October 2017, via Inside Out Music. Apart from the regular edition, the album was released on special editions including a CD digipak and a gatefold 2LP + CD (including etching on side D).

Band leader and vocalist Anneke van Giersbergen viewed past collaborator Devin Townsend as an influence on the album. Marcela Bovio was initially going to act as secondary vocalist for the album, but left the band mid-production due to divergences about the direction the vocals should take.

Song information 
All songs on the album are inspired by cities visited by van Giersbergen during her years of touring. The cities involved are: Berlin, Rotterdam, Beirut, San Francisco, Rio, London, Santiago, Mexico City, Helsinki, Istanbul and Paris. According to van Giersbergen:

On 8 September 2017, a video for the opening track "My Champion – Berlin" was released. Commenting on this particular track, van Giersbergen said that it "serves as a kind of master of ceremonies. It's both heavy and melodic, it showcases the technical abilities of the band, but you can still sing along to it. [...] This song is about Berlin after World War II. The goddess on the Berlin Victory Column was raised to commemorate military victories, but in the song the city speaks to her and is asking her for help to overcome troubled times". The song was composed by guitarist Jord Otto.

"The Fire – San Francisco" talks about people's lives before, during and after the 1906 San Francisco earthquake. The track "Days Go By – London" talks about the Great Fire of London from the perspective of the fire itself, although it is also a song about hope. It was the first song to be written for the album.

Critical reception 

The album received mixed to positive reviews by critics, with most reviewers praising van Giersbergen's performance, but some criticizing the songwriting.

Angry Metal Guy's GardensTale pointed some problems like an underrepresented bass and an "attempt at a wall of sound during the episodes of triumphant grandeur [that] limit the dynamics", but ended up calling the album "truly excellent" and considered it perhaps "the heaviest music she has put out to date".

In a review for The Prog Report, Craig Ellis Bacon praised the album's heaviness and the individual performances of van Giersbergen and drummer Ed Warby, as well as the album's production. He concluded by saying the album is "a wonderful debut that finds a "new" band in full swing right from the get-go".

Writing for Echoes and Dust, Michael Baker was less enthusiastic about the release. Although he praised van Giersbergen's performance, he felt "the songs themselves don't quite make it to those heights. Throughout VUUR you can hear moments of Devin Townsend and Arjen Lucassen of Ayreon, but there is a feeling of a lack of confidence that means Vuur often take the safer well trod path that ultimately means the songs never hit their stride. They are never heavy or progressive enough to stand out or melodic and catchy enough to work as arena filling power ballads". He ultimately called the band's debut "competent but frustrating".

On Prog, Alex Lynham commented that "for all the talent here, ultimately the record drags. Several album tracks are overlong and similar, and despite the vocal hooks and deft musicianship, there's a lack of 'wow' moments. The LP is at its best when it veers closest to the kind of cinematic metal that the Devin Townsend Project ply their trade in [...]. Overall, this is a promising start, but one that hopefully will see the band developing in a unique direction on future releases".

Track listing

Personnel 
 Anneke van Giersbergen - lead and backing vocals, rhythm guitar
 Jord Otto - guitars 
 Ferry Duijsens - guitars
 Johan van Stratum - bass
 Ed Warby - drums

Other personnel
 Joost van den Broek - producing, songwriting
 Mark Holcomb (Periphery), Esa Holopainen (Amorphis), Daniel Cardoso (Anathema) - songwriting
 Black & Finch - cover art

References 

2017 debut albums
Inside Out Music albums